Elizabeth "Lisa" Hernandez (born July 14, 1961) is a member of the Illinois House of Representatives for the 24th district. The 24th district, located in the Chicago area, includes parts of Berwyn, Brookfield, Cicero, Riverside, and Stickney and includes parts of the Chicago neighborhood of South Lawndale. Hernandez was born in Fort Leonard Wood, Missouri in 1961 and lives in Cicero with her husband Charles and their three children.

Electoral career
Hernandez was first elected as State Representative in 2006.

On July 30, 2022, Hernandez was elected chairperson of the Democratic Party of Illinois by the Illinois Democratic State Central Committee. She unseated incumbent chairperson Robin Kelly. Hernandez had been endorsed by Illinois Governor J.B. Pritzker and Jesús "Chuy" García prior to the election.

Illinois House of Representatives

Committees
As of July 3, 2022, Representative Hernandez is a member of the following Illinois House committees:
 Appropriations - Elementary & Secondary Education Committee
 Appropriations - Higher Education Committee 
 Consumer Protection Committee 
 Executive Committee 
 Immigration & Human Rights Committee 
 Income Tax Subcommittee 
 Labor & Commerce Committee
 Redistricting Committee (Chairperson)
 Revenue & Finance Committee
 Rules Committee

Electoral history

References

External links
Representative Elizabeth Hernandez (D) 24th District at the Illinois General Assembly
By session: 98th, 97th, 96th, 95th
State Rep. Elizabeth Hernandez (24th Dist) constituency site
 
Rep. Elizabeth 'Lisa' Hernandez at Illinois House Democrats

1961 births
21st-century American politicians
21st-century American women politicians
Hispanic and Latino American state legislators in Illinois
Living people
Democratic Party members of the Illinois House of Representatives
Northeastern University alumni
People from Fort Leonard Wood, Missouri
Women state legislators in Illinois
Illinois Democratic Party chairs